Frank Jenner Brooker (11 October 1875 – 25 July 1939) was a New Zealand rugby union player. A siderow forward in the days of the 2-3-3 scrum formation, Brooker represented Canterbury at a provincial level. He was a member of the New Zealand national side on their 1897 tour of Australia, appearing in four matches.

Brooker died in the Wellington suburb of Khandallah on 25 July 1939, and was buried at Karori Cemetery.

References

1875 births
1939 deaths
Rugby union players from Christchurch
New Zealand rugby union players
New Zealand international rugby union players
Canterbury rugby union players
Rugby union forwards
Burials at Karori Cemetery